Tom Lamar Beauchamp (born 1939) is an American philosopher specializing in the work of David Hume, moral philosophy, bioethics, and animal ethics. He is Professor Emeritus of Philosophy at Georgetown University, where he was Senior Research Scholar at the Kennedy Institute of Ethics.

Beauchamp authored or co-authored several books on ethics and on Hume, including Hume and the Problem of Causation (1981, with Alexander Rosenberg), Principles of Biomedical Ethics (1985, with James F. Childress), and The Human Use of Animals (1998, with F. Barbara Orlans et al). He is the co-editor with R. G. Frey of The Oxford Handbook of Animal Ethics (2011). He is also the co-editor of the complete works of Hume, The Critical Edition of the Works of David Hume (1999), published by Oxford University Press.

Education
He earned a BA from Southern Methodist University in 1963, a BD from Yale Divinity School, and PhD in philosophy from Johns Hopkins University in 1970. He is a fellow of the Hastings Center.

Career
Beauchamp worked on the staff of the National Commission for the Protection of Human Subjects of Biomedical and Behavioral Research, where he co-wrote the Belmont Report in 1978. He subsequently joined with James Childress to write Principles of Biomedical Ethics (1979), the first major American bioethics textbook. Beauchamp is also an expert on the philosophy of David Hume. He is the coeditor of the complete works of Hume published by Oxford University Press, and together with Alexander Rosenberg is the author of Hume and the Problem of Causation (1981), in which Hume's regularity theory of causation is defended, along with a nonskeptical interpretation of Hume's arguments against induction.

He has also written extensively about animal rights, and has defended a theory of animal rights which would significantly alter, though would not end, the ways in which non-human animals are currently used.

Beauchamp retired in 2016. A ceremony celebrating his career featured tributes from Maggie Little, Bill Blattner, Jeffrey Kahn, James Childress, Alexander Rosenberg, Patricia King, David DeGrazia, Wayne Davis, Jack DeGioia, and his children.

See also
American philosophy
List of American philosophers
List of animal rights advocates
Principlism

Notes

External links
 Homepage, Georgetown University.

1939 births
Living people
American animal rights scholars
Bioethicists
Hastings Center Fellows
Hume scholars
Georgetown University faculty
Johns Hopkins University alumni
Philosophers from Washington, D.C.
Southern Methodist University alumni
Yale Divinity School alumni